Filipina singer Nina has released five video albums and appeared in forty-five music videos, three films and thirteen television shows. After signing a record deal with Warner Music Philippines, Nina released her first single, "Heaven," in 2002. Its music video was inspired by the cover art of her debut album of the same name where she is dancing in front of the camera while animations appear in the background. In 2003, the music videos for "Jealous" and "Foolish Heart" gained popularity in the Philippines, topping various music video charts in the country. "Jealous" featured actor Cedric Carreon, playing the role of ex-boyfriend in the music video. It won Favorite New Artist in a Video at the 2003 MTV Pilipinas Music Award. The music video for "Loving You" depicts Nina on a journey in a fantasy world to find her dream guy. All music videos from the album Heaven (2002) were directed by Avid Liongoren, except "Foolish Heart." "A Girl Can Dream," the second single from her second studio album Smile (2003) featured singer Christian Bautista as her love interest in a school-themed music video. In 2004, Nina appeared in a cameo appearance for the comedy film Masikip sa Dibdib.

Marla Ancheta directed the Nina Live! (2005) concert album which became a huge success in the Philippines, being released as home video and certifying Diamond by the Philippine Association of the Record Industry (PARI). Nina's performance of "Love Moves in Mysterious Ways" earned three nominations on the Myx Music Awards 2006, while "Burn" won the Favorite Collaboration award. A music video was filmed for "I Love You Goodbye" which featured Nina breaking up with her lover at a bus stop. In 2006, the singles "I Do" and "Someday," from her third studio album Nina (2006), were both directed by Treb Monteras II. The former won the Favorite Urban Video accolade at the Myx Music Awards 2007 while the latter was nominated for Favorite Mellow Video. In 2007, the music video for "Collide" was directed by Sean Lim as theme song for his debut sci-fi film, Xenoa. The Ancheta-directed music video for "I Don't Want to Miss a Thing" was released as lead single from Nina's fourth studio album Nina Sings the Hits of Diane Warren (2008) and it helped the album reach Gold status one week from release. The following year, "There You'll Be" was directed by Lim, and described by Nina as a "thank you" video for her fans.

The music video for "Dance," the lead single from Nina's sixth studio album Stay Alive (2011), was directed by Lim and became a critical acclaim. It featured the cameo appearance of R&B singer Duncan Ramos and Nina in Gaga-ish costumes while dancing to the song. The video was called "futuristic and edgy" by critics who also tagged Nina as the "new dance diva," and it was nominated for Music Video of the Year at the 2012 PMPC Star Awards for Music. In 2012, Owen Reyes directed the music video for "Only with You" which featured behind-the-scenes footage from Nina's Playboy Philippines photo shoot. In the same year, she appeared as herself in the opening credit scenes of the film A Secret Affair, performing "Don't Say Goodbye."

Music videos

Guest appearances

Video albums

Televised concerts

Filmography

Television shows

Notes
 A promotional music video for "2nd Floor" was released late in 2002, featuring a live performance by Nina.
 A short clip from the 2004 film Masikip sa Dibdib (directed by Joyce Bernal), where Nina performed her song "What If," is considered as one of her music videos.
 Other songs from Nina Live! received massive airplay in Philippine music channels though were not actually released as commercial singles.
 In 2007, myx music channel aired a promotional video for "Someday" (Future Confessional Remix) which was edited by Mark Geolagon.
 Two different music videos were recorded for "Dance." Version 2 premiered on December 9, 2011, while Version 1 was never released.

References

Videography
Videographies of Filipino artists